Berkakit is an urban locality (an urban-type settlement) in Neryungrinsky District of the Sakha Republic, Russia, located  from Neryungri, the administrative center of the district. As of the 2010 Census, its population was 4,291.

History
Urban-type settlement status was granted to it in 1977.

Administrative and municipal status
Within the framework of administrative divisions, the urban-type settlement of Berkakit is incorporated within Neryungrinsky District as the Settlement of Berkakit. As a municipal division, the Settlement of Berkakit is incorporated within Neryungrinsky Municipal District as Berkakit Urban Settlement.

Transportation
Berkakit sits on both the Amur–Yakutsk Mainline and Amur–Yakutsk Highway.

References

Notes

Sources
Official website of the Sakha Republic. Registry of the Administrative-Territorial Divisions of the Sakha Republic. Neryungrinsky District. 

Urban-type settlements in the Sakha Republic